Jesús Gabriel Sandoval Chávez (born November 12, 1972) is a Mexican former professional boxer who competed from 1994 to 2010. He is a two-weight world champion, having held the WBC super featherweight title from 2003 to 2004, and the IBF lightweight title from 2005 to 2007.

Early life
Chávez was born in Delicias, Chihuahua, Mexico, and raised in Chicago, Illinois. He became a legal U.S. resident as a child, but at age 16 he was convicted of being an accessory to armed robbery, spent four years in prison, and was subsequently deported back to Mexico. Nevertheless, he struggled to regain American citizenship and work his way up in boxing ranks.

Professional career
Chávez's first title opportunity came against WBC Super Featherweight champion Floyd Mayweather Jr. where he retired in the 9th round after an entertaining bout. He rebounded to win Mayweather's vacated WBC title on a fight for the title against 43-1 world champion Sirimongkol Eaimthuam by a twelve round unanimous decision at the Austin Convention Center in his hometown Austin, Texas on August 15, 2003, but lost it on his first defense, to the then two-time champion Erik Morales. In another exciting fight, Chávez rocked Morales early in the first round. Morales recovered and knocked Chávez down twice in the 2nd round, but Chávez came back and fought hard for the rest of the fight, despite having a torn rotator cuff and torn ACL. Morales won a close decision, but Chávez gained further respect for his effort. In his next fight, he took on former IBF Champion Carlos Hernández, who in turn had also lost his own title to Morales. In an exciting 12-round war, Chávez pulled out a close decision.

IBF lightweight champion and death of Leavander Johnson
He then moved up to the Lightweight division to take on IBF champion Leavander Johnson. In an unfortunate bout, Chávez out-hustled Johnson throughout the entire fight, beating him severely for the entire fight until the referee finally stepped in and ended it. Johnson died several days later after he went into a coma. Despite being implicated in the tragedy, Johnson's family encouraged Chávez to keep fighting.

In 2007, Chávez lost his IBF title to Julio Díaz.

On September 6, 2008, Jesús "El Matador" Chávez, (44-4 with 31 Win by TKO) knocked out visiting Andres Ledesma,of Colombia 42 seconds into the 9th round of their lightweight bout, at the Toyota Center, in Houston, Texas. Chávez, of Austin, also floored Ledesma in the 7th round.

On April 4, 2009, Chávez was defeated by Michael Katsidis via 8th round TKO. He is trained by Richard Lord.

Personal life
His struggle to attain legal U.S. residence and work his way up the boxing ranks was documented in the film "Split Decision". His life story was also documented in the book "Standing Eight: The Inspiring Story of Jesus El Matador Chavez". In 2004, Chávez married US National Guard intelligence officer Aunisa Stroklund before she was deployed to the war in Iraq. 
As of 2017 Chávez and Stroklund are divorced and Chávez now resides in Dallas, Texas.

Professional boxing record

References

Further reading
 Jan Reid, The Bullet Meant for Me: A Memoir, Broadway, 2002, 
 Adam Pitluk, Standing Eight: The Inspiring Story of Jesús "El Matador" Chávez, Who Became Lightweight Champion of the World, Da Capo Press, 2006,

External links

1972 births
International Boxing Federation champions
Super-featherweight boxers
Lightweight boxers
Living people
Mexican male boxers
Boxers from Chihuahua (state)
World Boxing Council champions
People deported from the United States
Featherweight boxers
World super-featherweight boxing champions
World lightweight boxing champions
People from Delicias, Chihuahua